Brown Township may refer to:

Arkansas
 Brown Township, Monroe County, Arkansas, in Monroe County, Arkansas

Illinois
 Brown Township, Champaign County, Illinois

Indiana
 Brown Township, Hancock County, Indiana
 Brown Township, Hendricks County, Indiana
 Brown Township, Montgomery County, Indiana
 Brown Township, Morgan County, Indiana
 Brown Township, Ripley County, Indiana
 Brown Township, Washington County, Indiana

Iowa
 Brown Township, Linn County, Iowa

Michigan
 Brown Township, Michigan

Missouri
 Brown Township, Douglas County, Missouri, in Douglas County, Missouri

North Dakota
 Brown Township, McHenry County, North Dakota, in McHenry County, North Dakota

Ohio
 Brown Township, Carroll County, Ohio
 Brown Township, Darke County, Ohio
 Brown Township, Delaware County, Ohio
 Brown Township, Franklin County, Ohio
 Brown Township, Knox County, Ohio
 Brown Township, Miami County, Ohio
 Brown Township, Paulding County, Ohio
 Brown Township, Vinton County, Ohio

Pennsylvania
 Brown Township, Lycoming County, Pennsylvania
 Brown Township, Mifflin County, Pennsylvania

Township name disambiguation pages